The match rating approach (MRA) is a phonetic algorithm for indexing of words by their pronunciation developed by Western Airlines in 1977 for the indexation and comparison of homophonous names.

The algorithm itself has a simple set of encoding rules but a more lengthy set of comparison rules.
The main mechanism is the similarity comparison, which calculates the number of unmatched characters by comparing the strings from left to right and then from right to left, and removing identical characters. This value is subtracted from 6 and then compared to a minimum threshold. The minimum threshold is defined in table A and is dependent upon the length of the strings.

The encoded name is known (perhaps incorrectly) as a personal numeric identifier (PNI). The encoded name can never contain more than 6 alpha only characters.

The match rating approach performs well with names containing the letter "y", unlike the original flavor of the NYSIIS algorithm; for example, the surnames "Smith" and "Smyth" are successfully matched. However, MRA does not perform well with encoded names that differ in length by more than 2.

Encoding rules

 Delete all vowels unless the vowel begins the word
 Remove the second consonant of any double consonants present
 Reduce codex to 6 letters by joining the first 3 and last 3 letters only

Comparison rules

In this section, the words "string(s)" and "name(s)" mean "encoded string(s)" and "encoded name(s)".

 If the length difference between the encoded strings is 3 or greater, then no similarity comparison is done.
 Obtain the minimum rating value by calculating the length sum of the encoded strings and using table A
 Process the encoded strings from left to right and remove any identical characters found from both strings respectively.
 Process the unmatched characters from right to left and remove any identical characters found from both names respectively.
 Subtract the number of unmatched characters from 6 in the longer string. This is the similarity rating.
 If the similarity rating equal to or greater than the minimum rating then the match is considered good.

Minimum threshold

The following table shows the mapping between the minimum rating and the string lengths.

Match rating approach examples

The table below displays the output of the match rating approach algorithm for some common homophonous names.

See also 

Soundex

References

External links

 An Overview of The Issues Related to the use of Personal Identifiers, HSMD, Statistics Canada
 C# Implementation: http://sounditout.codeplex.com/

Phonetic algorithms